Perry Cotton (born 11 November 1965) is an association football player who represented New Zealand at international level.

He played for Scunthorpe United.

Cotton made his full All Whites debut in a 3–0 win over Fiji on 7 June 1992 and ended his international playing career with 10 A-international caps and 1 goals to his credit, his final cap an appearance in a 2–2 draw with Uruguay on 28 June 1995.

References

External links

1965 births
Living people
New Zealand association footballers
New Zealand international footballers
New Zealand people of English descent
Association football midfielders

Sister= Stacy cotton 
Currently in Queensland Australia
Primary school teacher